The Repeal Bill plan, officially known as Legislating for the United Kingdom’s withdrawal from the European Union (Cm 9446), was a UK Government white paper setting out the Governments proposals for repealing the European Communities Act 1972 and how to maintain a fully functioning statute book after the United Kingdom had left the European Union. It was published on 30 March 2017 (the day after the UK triggered Article 50 by the Department for Exiting the European Union. 

The plan would lead to the European Union (Withdrawal) Act 2018 which received Royal Assent in June 2018 and the ECA was repealed when the United Kingdom left the European Union on 31 January 2020 almost a year after the original intended date of 29 March 2019 for leaving the bloc had passed.

See also
2016 United Kingdom European Union membership referendum
Brexit
Brexit plan
Chequers plan

References 

2017 documents
2017 in international relations
2017 in the United Kingdom
Brexit-related agreements
White papers